"The Year That Clayton Delaney Died" is a song written and recorded by American country music artist Tom T. Hall.

Background
The song is based on Hall's childhood neighbor and boyhood hero, Lonnie Easterling.

Chart performance 
It was released in July 1971 as the only single from the album, In Search of a Song. "The Year That Clayton Delaney Died" was Hall's second number one on the country chart. The single stayed at number one for two weeks and spent a total of eighteen weeks on the country charts.

Weekly charts

Year-end charts

References

External links
 

1971 singles
Tom T. Hall songs
Songs written by Tom T. Hall
Song recordings produced by Jerry Kennedy
1971 songs
Mercury Records singles